The 1997 Wisconsin Badgers football team represented the University of Wisconsin during the 1997 Big Ten Conference football season. They were led by eight year head coach Barry Alvarez and participated as members of the Big Ten Conference. The Badgers played their home games at Camp Randall Stadium in Madison, Wisconsin.

After suffering a humiliating loss at the hands of Donovan McNabb and the Syracuse Orangemen in their season opener, the Wisconsin Badgers sprang back to win eight of their next nine games. After defeating Boise State, San Jose State, and San Diego State, the Badgers won consecutive games with field goals as time expired against Indiana and Northwestern. In the course of this streak, the Badgers snapped a long losing streak at the hands of the Iowa Hawkeyes with a 13–10 win, the first Wisconsin win over a Hayden Fry-coached team ever. After defeating Iowa, Barry Alvarez's team fell apart down the stretch, losing to eventual national champion Michigan, Penn State, and Georgia in the Outback Bowl.

While the Badgers suffered a 3-game losing streak to close out the year, the 1997 campaign set the stage for the incredibly successful 1998 season.

Schedule

Season summary

Syracuse

Boise State

San Jose State

San Diego State

Indiana

Northwestern

Illinois

Purdue

Minnesota

Iowa

Michigan

Penn State

Outback Bowl

Roster

Regular starters

Team players selected in the 1998 NFL Draft

References

Wisconsin
Wisconsin Badgers football seasons
Wisconsin Badgers football